The Doctor's Horrible Experiment is a 1959 French black-and-white television film directed by Jean Renoir. It has been released in the United Kingdom as Experiment in Evil and on DVD as The Testament of Doctor Cordelier. The film is a retelling of the 1886 novella Strange Case of Dr Jekyll and Mr Hyde by Robert Louis Stevenson set in 1950s France. Jean-Louis Barrault plays Dr. Cordelier/Opale, the substitute for Dr. Jekyll/Hyde character; the film is also known for its visual style that is far above the normal television programs of the 1950s.

Plot
In Paris, the lawyer Joly is given the will of his friend and client Cordelier, a well-known psychiatrist, who leaves everything to a patient called Opale. However Joly learns that this Opale is a sadistic pervert and murderer who keeps evading the police. He even causes the death of another leading psychiatrist, Séverin, who challenged Cordelier's views. The climax comes after a smart party at Cordelier's capacious house, when he is heard howling with pain in his laboratory. Breaking in, Joly finds Opale, who admits he is really Cordelier and makes his confession. Guilt over his sexual exploitation of female staff and patients led him, by long research into mind-altering drugs, to create a separate persona through which he could enact his hidden desires without taking responsibility. Swallowing an overdose, he dies.

Cast
 Jean-Louis Barrault as Dr. Cordelier/Opale 
 
 
 Teddy Bilis as Maître Joly 
 
 
 Jean Bertho as Premier passant 
 
 
 Jacques Ciron as Deuxième passant 
 
 
 Jean Topart as Désiré 
 
 
 Michel Vitold as Docteur Séverin 
 
 
 Jacques Danoville as Commissaire Lardaut (as Jacques Dannoville)
 
 
 André Certes as Inspecteur Salbris

Reception

Author and film critic Leonard Maltin awarded the film three out of a possible four stars, praising Barrault's performance, and direction.

References

External links
 

1959 television films
1959 films
1959 horror films
Films directed by Jean Renoir
Films set in Paris
French television films
1950s French-language films
Dr. Jekyll and Mr. Hyde films
French horror films
1950s science fiction horror films
Horror television films
Films scored by Joseph Kosma
1950s French films